Mahendra Yadav (1949/1950  5 July 2020) was a politician in the Indian National Congress. He was an MLA from Delhi's Palam constituency in 1998. He was convicted in a 1984 anti-Sikh riots case and was sentenced to 10 years in prison.

Death
Yadav died on 4 July 2020 at the age of 70 from COVID-19 during the COVID-19 pandemic in India. Mahendra Yadav was serving sentence in jail 14 at Mandoli Jail, a sub-jail of Tihar Jail. After a prisoner died from COVID-19 on June 15, all 29 prisoners were tested, with 17 positive and 12 negative results. However, on June 25, the 12 negative prisoners were retested and 3, including Mahendra Yadav, tested positive. On June 26, Yadav felt unwell and experienced heart-related issues, and was taken to Deen Dayal Upadhyay Hospital before being transferred to Loknayak Jaiprakash Hospital. His relatives requested that he be admitted to a private hospital under police protection and the jail administration granted their request. Yadav was admitted to Akash Health Care Hospital in Dwarka on June 30, where he ultimately passed away on July 4.

See also 
 1984 anti-Sikh riots

References 

20th-century births
2020 deaths
Delhi MLAs 1998–2003
Indian National Congress politicians
1984 anti-Sikh riots
Indian politicians convicted of crimes
Year of birth uncertain
Deaths from the COVID-19 pandemic in India